Han, Hun, Dirch og Dario ( He, She, Dirch and Dario) is a 1962 Danish comedy film directed by Annelise Reenberg and starring Ghita Nørby.

Cast
 Ghita Nørby - Marianne Borg
 Ebbe Langberg - Poul Borg
 Dirch Passer - Eigil Hansen
 Dario Campeotto - Mario
 Gitte Hænning - Dorte
 Bodil Steen - Jenny
 Hanne Borchsenius - Laura Lublinski
 Sigrid Horne-Rasmussen - Fru Frederiksen
 Edouard Mielche - Musikprofessor Harald Lublinski
 Gabriel Axel - Modedesigneren Monsieur Baptiste
 Asbjørn Andersen - Teaterdirektør Thomsen
 Axel Strøbye - Henry
 Bjørn Puggaard-Müller - Scenograf Petersen

External links

1962 films
1962 comedy films
1960s Danish-language films
Films directed by Annelise Reenberg
Films scored by Sven Gyldmark
Danish comedy films